William Benson Buck (April 20, 1934 – August 26, 1970) was an American writer who produced novelized translations into English of the Sanskrit epic poems Mahabharata and Ramayana. A translation of Harivamsa was unfinished at his death.

Biography

Buck was born in Washington, D.C., one of six children of U.S. Congressman Frank H. Buck. He had a sister and four half-siblings. He was a member of the wealthy Buck family of Marin County, California. His great-grandfather was Leonard W. Buck, a politician and businessman. His father died in Washington, D.C. in 1942 while still in office. His mother, Eva Benson Buck, was born to Swedish parents and was Buck's second wife. After her husband's death, she moved back to Vacaville, California with William and his younger sister Carol Franc Buck, who grew up at the family's mansion at 225 Buck Ave.

According to the publisher's preface to the 2012 republication of Buck's translations of Mahabharata and Ramayana, Buck was in 1955 inspired by reading a 19th-century translation of Bhagavad Gita, in a state library in Carson City, Nevada. He discovered that a proposed 11-volume Indian publication of Mahabharata was at risk for lack of funds, and subsidized it. He began to study Sanskrit, and to make his own translations. He later wrote:

Buck's translations have been praised by Levi Asher and others.

In 1961, he was sued for paternity by Jane Hammer Buck, who had lived with Buck "as husband and wife" in Bolinas, California, for six years. She stated that William acknowledged paternity of the boy, Paul Buck, who was born in San Francisco in 1958, but was seeking monthly child support payments.

Publications

References

Notes

External links

1933 births
1970 deaths
People from Mill Valley, California
Sanskrit–English translators
American translators
20th-century translators
American people of Swedish descent
Translators of the Ramayana